"Are You Still in Love with Me" is a song written by Jack White, K. C. Porter, and Mark Spiro, and performed by Anne Murray. The song reached #8 on the Canadian Adult Contemporary chart, #10 on the Canadian Country chart, and #20 on the US Country chart in 1987. It was released in May 1987 as the first single from her album Harmony. The song was produced by White.

Charts

References

1987 singles
1987 songs
Songs written by K. C. Porter
Songs written by Mark Spiro
Anne Murray songs
Capitol Records singles
Songs written by Jack White (music producer)